Arroyo Mocho is a  stream which originates in the far northeastern corner of Santa Clara County and flows northwesterly into eastern Alameda County, California. After traversing the cities of Livermore and Pleasanton it joins South San Ramon Creek to become Arroyo de la Laguna, which in turn flows to Alameda Creek and thence to San Francisco Bay.

History
Arroyo Mocho means "cutoff creek". Erwin G. Gudde's California Place Names says it got the name because it historically had no outlet but dissipated into the ground after spreading out into many smaller streams between Livermore and Pleasanton. As early as 1852 it was also called Mocho Creek. Frank Latta, in his book on Joaquin Murrieta, says it got its name from the nickname of the man who ran the Murrietta gang's water stations and holding corrals in this area along La Vereda del Monte, the route of their drives of captured mustangs and stolen horses to the south. These stations were on the arroyo near Mud Springs and at Valle de Mocho, what is now known as Blackbird Valley, near the source of the arroyo, just south of Mount Mocho, which was also named for this man, known as "Mocho" (meaning lopped off or short) for his diminutive stature.

Watershed and course
The Arroyo Mocho watershed drains . Arroyo Mocho originates on the western slope of  Mount Mocho in the northeast corner of Santa Clara County and flows west to Mines Road which it follows northwest into Alameda County. It passes Sweet Springs, a magnesia spring known for its sweet taste. Although historically it sank into the area between Livermore and Pleasanton now the site of multiple gravel pits, there is an engineered channel connecting it to Arroyo de la Laguna.

The underlying aquifer is the Mocho Subbasin, whose eastern boundary is the Tesla Fault.

Ecology
Arroyo Mocho has a self-sustaining rainbow trout (Oncorhynchus mykiss) population, and trout can migrate to the lower watershed from Alameda Creek.

See also
 Alameda Creek
 Arroyo de la Laguna
 List of watercourses in the San Francisco Bay Area

References

External links
 Arroyo Mocho Watershed Map at Oakland Museum 

Rivers of Alameda County, California
Tributaries of Alameda Creek
Diablo Range
Livermore Valley
Geography of Pleasanton, California
Livermore, California
Rivers of Northern California
La Vereda del Monte